Falke was the sixth and last Type 23 torpedo boat built for the German Navy (initially called the Reichsmarine and then renamed as the Kriegsmarine in 1935). The boat made multiple non-intervention patrols during the Spanish Civil War in the late 1930s. During World War II, she played a minor role in the Norwegian Campaign of 1940. Falke spent the next several months escorting minelayers as they laid minefields and damaged heavy ships back to Germany before she was transferred to France around September. She started laying minefields herself that month and continued to do so for the rest of the war. After a refit in early 1941, the boat was transferred to the Skaggerak where she was assigned escort duties. Falke returned to France in 1942 and was one of the escorts for the capital ships sailing from France to Germany through the English Channel in the Channel Dash. She helped to escort blockade runners, commerce raiders and submarines through the Channel and the Bay of Biscay for the next several years. The boat attacked Allied ships during the Invasion of Normandy in June 1944, but was sunk by British bombers that same month.

Design and armament
Derived from the World War I-era large torpedo boat , the Type 23 torpedo boat was slightly larger, but had a similar armament and speed. Their crew consisted of 4 officers and 116 sailors.

As built, the Type 23s mounted three  SK L/45 guns, one forward and two aft of the superstructure; the aft superfiring gun was on an open mount while the others were protected by gun shields. They carried six above-water 50 cm (19.7 in) torpedo tubes in two triple mounts and could also carry up to 30 mines. After 1931, the torpedo tubes were replaced by  tubes and a pair of  C/30 anti-aircraft guns were added. During the war a quadruple 2 cm mount was added just forward of No. 2 gun, three 2 cm guns were positioned around the aft funnel and another pair were mounted on the bridge wings, all in single mounts. Around 1944 a FuMB 4 Sumatra radar detector was installed as was radar.

Construction and career
Named after the Falcon, the boat was laid down at the Reichsmarinewerft Wilhelmshaven (Navy Yard) on 17 November 1925. as yard number 106, launched on 29 September 1926 and commissioned on 15 July 1928. The boat was initially assigned to the 4th Torpedo Boat Half Flotilla. By the end of 1936 Falke was assigned to the 4th Torpedo Boat Flotilla and the boat made several deployments to Spain during the Spanish Civil War.

Second World War
Now assigned to the 5th Torpedo Boat Flotilla, Falke was used in the North Sea mining operations that began on 3 September 1939. Together with the torpedo boat , Falke impounded six ships in the Skaggerak during a contraband patrol in 14–16 December. During the Norwegian Campaign, Falke and Jaguar, among other ships, briefly rendered assistance to the torpedoed heavy cruiser  before continuing onwards to Kristiansand on 11 April with reinforcements. From 21–23 June, Falke was one of the escorts for the badly damaged Scharnhorst from Norway to Kiel. Now assigned to the 5th Torpedo Boat Flotilla, Falke, her sister , and the torpedo boats Jaguar,  and  escorted minelayers as they laid a minefield in the southwestern North Sea on 7–8 August. The flotilla escorted other minelaying missions in the same area on 14–15 August, 31 August – 2 September and 6–7 September. Reinforced by the torpedo boat , the flotilla made an unsuccessful sortie off the Isle of Wight on 8–9 October. They made a second, more successful, sortie on 11–12 October, sinking two Free French submarine chasers and two British trawlers. The 5th Flotilla was transferred to St. Nazaire later that month and its ships laid a minefield off Dover on 3–4 December and another one in the Channel on 21–22 December.

1941–1944
Now based in Norway, Falke and the torpedo boat  escorted a minelaying mission from Stavanger on the night of 26/27 January 1941 and then another one the following night. Falke escorted another such mission on 3–4 February, together with the 1st and 2nd Torpedo Boat Flotillas. The boat was refitted in Rotterdam, Netherlands, from March to May 1941. She was transferred afterwards to the Skagerrak where she was on convoy escort duties until January 1942 when she rejoined the 5th Flotilla in the West. The flotilla joined the escort force for Scharnhorst, Gneisenau and the heavy cruiser  on 12 February 1942 off Cap Gris-Nez during the Channel Dash. The flotilla escorted the commerce raider  through the English Channel from 12 to 19 May. In heavy fighting on the 13th, British motor torpedo boats (MTBs) sank her sister, and the torpedo boat  while losing one of their own boats. Falke was refitted in Wilhelmshaven from June to August and returned to France. Falke and Kondor and the torpedo boats  and  escorted the Italian blockade runner, from Bordeaux through the Bay of Biscay on 29–30 November.

Falke, T2, T12, T23, and the torpedo boat  escort another Italian blockade runner, Himalaya, but she turned back on 28 March 1943 when spotted by a British reconnaissance aircraft. Falke, Greif, Kondor, Möwe and T22 laid two minefields in the English Channel on 4–6 June. Later that month the ships returned to the Bay of Biscay to help escort U-boats through the Bay and continued to do so into early August. The flotilla was ordered to transfer from Cherbourg to Le Havre and departed on the night of 23/24 May 1944. Möwe, Greif, Falke, Kondor and Jaguar were attacked by Allied aircraft early the next day and Greif was struck by two bombs that set her forward boiler room on fire and caused her to take on water forward. With both boiler rooms subsequently flooded, she was unmaneuverable and accidentally collided with Falke. The latter was only slightly damaged, but Greifs bow was badly bent which caused problems for Möwe when she began to tow her sister. Around 06:00 Greif lost all power and sank at 06:32. At 07:43 Kondor struck a mine and had to be towed by Möwe for the remainder of the voyage.

As the Allies began landing in Normandy on 6 June, the 5th Flotilla, now consisting of Möwe, Falke, Jaguar and the newly refitted torpedo boat , sortied multiple times from Le Havre over the next week in attempts to sink Allied shipping. Despite the expenditure of over 50 torpedoes and large quantities of ammunition, they were generally unsuccessful, only sinking the destroyer  on 6 June. During an air raid by the Royal Air Force on the night of 14/15 June, bombs sank Falke and Jaguar and badly damaged Möwe.

Notes

References

Bibliography
 
 

 
 
 

 

Type 23 torpedo boats
1926 ships
Ships built in Wilhelmshaven